Hanleyanus oblongus is a species of bivalve in the genus Hanleyanus.

References

Tellinidae
Bivalves described in 1791